Madeley High School, established 1957, is a coeducational secondary school with academy status, located in the village of Madeley, Staffordshire, England. The school was founded as a secondary modern school. It became a comprehensive high school and then a Specialist Technology College with joint second specialisms in Arts and Cognition and Learning, before converting to academy status in September 2013. The school is now sponsored by the Shaw Education Trust.

Madeley School caters to children in the 11-16 age group. It serves mainly the area lying to the west of Newcastle Under Lyme including the communities of Keele, Madeley, Betley, Baldwins Gate, Maer, Aston, Mucklestone, Ashley, Ashley Heath, Knighton, Whitmore, Wrinehill, Almington, Hanchurch, Onneley and Loggerheads and Westlands.

Notable former pupils
 Anthony Bale, medievalist
 Peter Bebb, special effects artist 
 Bradley James, actor
 Lemmy, Motorhead singer
 Francesca Mills, actor
 Louis Moult, Striker for Preston North End
 Nathan Smith, Defender for Port Vale FC

References

External links
 

Secondary schools in Staffordshire
Educational institutions established in 1957
1957 establishments in England
Academies in Staffordshire
Shaw Education Trust